Callumbonella suturalis is a species of sea snail, a marine gastropod mollusk in the family Trochidae, the top snails.

Description
The size of the shell varies between 13 mm and 32 mm. The oblique, umbilicate shell has a depressed-conical shape. The shell is cream-colored, with the tint of a blush rose. The seven whorls are planate, very smooth in the middle. They are above and below coronated with series of small tubercles. The superior nodules large and acute. The sculpture is variable as regards the beaded rows of striae.  The body whorl is angulated, inferior face convex, concentrically cingulate. Its margin is very densely transversely striate and with oblique sulci, elegantly granulate-nodose. The about 16 basal cinguli are unequal. The aperture is angulated. Young specimens have a deep umbilicus which is inclosed within a sharp ridge.

Distribution
It was originally discovered as a fossil from the Pliocene in Sicily and Calabria, Italy, but later found alive in the Bay of Bay of Biscay. This species occurs in the Atlantic Ocean off Cape Verde Islands, the Canary Islands, Namibia and off Morocco; in the Mediterranean Sea off Algeria.

References

 Gofas, S.; Le Renard, J.; Bouchet, P. (2001). Mollusca, in: Costello, M.J. et al. (Ed.) (2001). European register of marine species: a check-list of the marine species in Europe and a bibliography of guides to their identification. Collection Patrimoines Naturels, 50: pp. 180–213

External links

 

suturalis
Gastropods described in 1836
Molluscs of the Atlantic Ocean
Molluscs of the Mediterranean Sea
Molluscs of the Canary Islands
Gastropods of Cape Verde
Invertebrates of North Africa